Milhan may refer to:
 Acacia citrinoviridis, the black mulga, river jam, milhan or wantan, a tree species endemic to Western Australia
 Milhan District, a district of the Al Mahwit Governorate, Yemen
 Rumaysa bint Milhan (medieval period), one of the earliest women converts to Islam in Yathrib